Matthew D. McCall (born July 3, 1981) is an American professional stock car racing driver and racing engineer. He currently works as a crew chief for RFK Racing's No. 6 Ford Mustang GT in the NASCAR Cup Series, driven by Brad Keselowski.

Career
McCall began racing at the age of nine, running go-karts. At the age of thirteen, he moved to the adult leagues, collecting over 150 wins, before moving to the World Karting Association Dirt Series. During that time, McCall collected the WKA's Most Improved Driver and Grand National Champion awards.

McCall's major racing debut came in 1999, when began running Super Sport races at Hickory Motor Speedway, finishing fourth in points. The next year, he won Rookie of the Year and Mechanic of the Year awards. He would be runner-up for the track championship the following season. He won six races apiece in 2003 and 2004 and won the track championship the later year. He also made his Craftsman Truck Series debut the next year at Martinsville Speedway, finishing 21st. In 2005, he won the UARA-Stars championship. He also competed in the Roush Racing: Driver X program and was a top 4 finalist. He later signed a  driver development contract with Yates Racing.

In 2006, he made his debut in the ARCA Re/MAX Series at Daytona, where he started and finished second. He also ran five Busch races for Yates, his best finish being a 24th at Bristol Motor Speedway. He was released after the season; he then joined Richard Childress Racing as an engineer, while racing in regional events and graduating from the University of North Carolina at Charlotte in 2003 with a degree in engineering. In 2009, he won a USAR event at Bristol.

In 2013, McCall acted as interim crew chief for Jeff Burton in the Brickyard 400; later in the year he returned to on-track competition, driving the No. 92 Chevrolet for RBR Enterprises in the Camping World Truck Series' UNOH 200 at Bristol, finishing 22nd in the event. After the 2014 season with Richard Childress Racing, he left to become the crew chief for Jamie McMurray starting in 2015. McCall and McMurray made the NASCAR playoffs in 2015, 2016 and 2017 but failed to make it in 2018. With the departure of McMurray after the 2018 season, McCall became the crew chief for Kurt Busch, who took over the No. 1 car for 2019. On July 13, 2019, McCall clinched his first win as crew chief during the Quaker State 400 at Kentucky Speedway.

With CGR closing down and selling its NASCAR team to Trackhouse Racing Team after the 2021 season, McCall moved to RFK Racing to crew chief their No. 6 car, driven by new driver/co-owner Brad Keselowski, in 2022. On March 24, 2022, McCall was suspended for four races and fined 100,000 for an L2 Penalty during post-race inspection after the 2022 Folds of Honor QuikTrip 500 at Atlanta. The penalty came under Sections 14.1 and 14.5 in the NASCAR Rule Book, both of which pertain to the modification of a single source supplied part. In addition, the No. 6 team was docked 100 driver and owner points and 10 playoff points. Team engineer Josh Sell was announced as Keselowski's crew chief for the 2022 Texas Grand Prix. On April 13, Scott Miller, NASCAR's senior vice president of competition, explained that the repairs No. 6's rear fascia did not meet original specifications, as a critical dimension of the part was altered.

Motorsports career results

NASCAR
(key) (Bold – Pole position awarded by qualifying time. Italics – Pole position earned by points standings or practice time. * – Most laps led.)

Busch Series

Camping World Truck Series

 Season still in progress
 Ineligible for series points

ARCA Re/Max Series
(key) (Bold – Pole position awarded by qualifying time. Italics – Pole position earned by points standings or practice time. * – Most laps led.)

References

External links
 
 

Living people
1981 births
People from Denver, North Carolina
Racing drivers from North Carolina
NASCAR drivers
University of North Carolina at Charlotte alumni
NASCAR crew chiefs
ARCA Menards Series drivers
Robert Yates Racing drivers